Mateo Figoli Martínez (born 3 August 1984 in Maldonado) is an Italian-Uruguayan footballer playing for Atenas.

Career
Figoli played for Mexican Primera División side Querétaro FC in 2006. In June 2008 he was signed by Triestina, from Hungarian company Rexan for €1,200,000 as third parties ownership (or later accused a false accounting). Triestina also received €400,000 from A.C. ChievoVerona by not excised the option to buy him in 2008–09 season. In December 2009 he was sold for a reported €50,000.

References

External links
 
 
 

1984 births
Living people
People from Punta del Este
Uruguayan footballers
Uruguayan expatriate footballers
Atenas de San Carlos players
Querétaro F.C. footballers
Club Puebla players
Club León footballers
Dorados de Sinaloa footballers
Association football midfielders
Danubio F.C. players
Rampla Juniors players
U.S. Triestina Calcio 1918 players
Cúcuta Deportivo footballers
Tecos F.C. footballers
Uruguayan Primera División players
Swiss Challenge League players
Serie B players
Liga MX players
Categoría Primera A players
Expatriate footballers in Mexico
Expatriate footballers in Switzerland
Expatriate footballers in Italy
Expatriate footballers in Colombia
Uruguayan people of Italian descent